Antonio D'Achiardi (28 November 1839, in Pisa – 10 December 1902, in Pisa) was an Italian geologist and mineralogist known for his mineralogical studies of Tuscany. He was the father of mineralogist , and the artist, Pietro D'Achiardi.

In 1859 he received his doctorate in sciences from the University of Pisa, afterwards working as an assistant for chemistry (from 1861). Three months after this appointment, he lost the use of his left eye due to a laboratory accident involving nitric acid. He subsequently abandoned his career in chemistry, and instead devoted his attention to geology and mineralogy, becoming a student of Giuseppe Meneghini. He later became a professor of geology at Pavia and in 1874 was appointed a professor of mineralogy at the University of Pisa. In 1881 he established a laboratory of mineralogy at Pisa.

The mineral dachiardite honors his name. D'Achiardi described the mineral after it was discovered by his son in a granitic pegmatite.

Selected works 
 Coralli fossili del terreno nummulitico delle Alpi Venete, 1868.
 Sulle Calcarie lenticolare e grossolana di Toscana, 1874.
 Bibliografia mineralogica, geologica e paleontologica della Toscana, 1875.
 Sull'origine dell'acido borico e dei borati, considerazioni ..., 1878.
 I metalli loro minerali e miniere, 1883.
 Guida al corso di mineralogia, 1900.

References 

1839 births
1902 deaths
19th-century Italian geologists
Italian mineralogists
Academic staff of the University of Pavia
Academic staff of the University of Pisa
University of Pisa alumni